is a passenger railway station located in the city of Nantan, Kyoto Prefecture, Japan, operated by West Japan Railway Company (JR West).

Lines

Station layout
The station consists of one ground-level island platform and one ground-level side platform connected to the station building by a footbridge. The station is unattended.

Platforms

History
Goma Station opened on August 25, 1910. With the privatization of the Japan National Railways (JNR) on April 1, 1987, the station came under the aegis of the West Japan Railway Company.

Passenger statistics
In fiscal 2018, the station was used by an average of 586 passengers daily.

Surrounding area
 Nantan Municipal Komago Elementary School

See also
List of railway stations in Japan

References

External links

 Station Official Site

Railway stations in Kyoto Prefecture
Sanin Main Line
Railway stations in Japan opened in 1910
Nantan, Kyoto